Sason robustum is a species of barychelid trapdoor spiders. It is only found in southern India, Sri Lanka and the Seychelles.

Males are about 9 mm long, females almost 11 mm.

Distinguishing features 
Sason robustum is characterized by absence of teeth on the claws; cuspules present on
maxillae and labium; rastellum absent; the apex of the first tibia
with a single stout prolateral spine; and the palpal bulb spherical
with a tapering embolus.

Taxonomy 
Sason robustum was first described by Octavius Pickard-Cambridge in 1883. He placed it in a new genus Sarpedon. However this name had already been used for a beetle, so in 1887, Eugène Simon put forward the replacement genus name, Sason.

References

Barychelidae
Spiders of Asia
Spiders of Africa
Spiders described in 1883